Temba is a town in City of Tshwane Metropolitan Municipality in the Gauteng province of South Africa.

Temba is divided into the following units

 Kudube Unit 1
 Manyeleti
 Unit D
 Unit D ( exts.)
 Unit 5
 Unit 7
 Leboneng

History

Temba is located in the greater Hammanskraal area which includes Mahube and Mathibestad. Tswana speaking people have lived in the area known as Temba from the 1700s. In the 19th century, Amandebele-a-Lebelo settled the area known as Hammanskraal  among groups of Tswana-speaking people. The main patriarchs of this Ndebele clan were the Kekana confederacy. The Kekana clan remains the dominant Ndebele authority over the Hammanskraal Area but the Tswana-speaking people of the area primarily form part of the Bakgatla and the Bakwena groups. 
The arrival of Europeans in the late 19th century created demarcated traditional area's with tribal foundations. The group area's act of 1913 also limited the expansion of the area.

The Amandebele-A-Lebelo were used to farming and grazing cattle on extensive pieces of land and soon they had too little to provide for the lively hoods of their people in the space of growing populations wherein they couldn't expand on their territorial vicinity.

In the 1940s, the Transvaal brought people in trucks from Orlando, Klipsruit and Lady Selbourne and a town of Sofasonke emerged. Sofasonke is Nguni for "We shall die together". The chief of the Kekana was requested by the Transvaal Government to allow the people to use their schools, churches and facilities. 
In the 1950s the tent town was developed into a space of permanent structures. Furthermore, tribal authorities, the state, and private businessmen invested money in a grand plan to house large numbers of migrant workers. This new development was seen as a new glimmer of hope. It was subsequently renamed to the Nguni name place of hope Temba.

In the 1940s, the area fell under the Bophuthatswana homeland government. The territory of Temba formed part of the North Eastern block of the Bophuthatswana which was the most densely populated part of the entire province. The reason why Temba formed part of Bophuthatswana is due to the fact that the majority of the people in the area were Tswana speaking people of the Bakwena and the Bakgatla clans.

Temba is functionally connected to the city of Pretoria by the old Warmbaths road and subsequently the N1 highway. As a result, it has become a largely dormant town with the majority of its residents commuting long distances to get access to employment.

The area has a mixed housing system with a third of the houses being supplied by the Apartheid governments subsidized rental housing system. Many of the houses in the territory are part of the free title stands. This is the result of the Ndebele cultural influence in the territory. The Ndebele are a proud people and have a great sense of pride in home ownership and focus culturally on individual identity. As a result, the central neighborhood of Manyleti among others are filled with free title stands with large houses built by the locals.

Education

Primary schools

 Kudube Primary School
 Refitlhile Primary School
 Lefofa Primary School
 Mosaledi Primary School
 Itireleng Primary School
 Reneilwe Primary School
 Mamotse Primary School
 Leboneng Primary School
 Masakhane Primary School

Secondary schools

 Makgetse Scondary School
 Kgetse Ya Tsie Secondary School
 Ratshepo Secondary School
 Sikhululekile Secondary School
 P.H.L Morake Secondary
 Tsebe Ntlha Secondary
 Madisong Secondary School

Tertiary

Tshwane North College

References

 Elsona Van Huyssteen Boundaries, Borders and Barriers: A narrative of Temba/ Hammanskraal

Populated places in the City of Tshwane